Cornelius Allen "Corny" Thompson (born February 5, 1960) is a retired American professional basketball player. He was a 6'8" (203 cm) 225 lb (102 kg) power forward who occasionally also played the center position. Thomson was a member of the Joventut Badalona team that reached a EuroLeague final in 1992, and lifted the trophy in 1994.

Early life
Corny started playing basketball because people suggested that he play because he was tall. He was about 6'5" before he got to High School. He wasn't serious about it until Middle School. From then on, every year, Corny progressed, went to camp and became a better player.

High school
Corny attended Middletown High School in Middletown, Connecticut. In his freshman season, Corny was too good for the freshman team so he was promoted up to the Varsity team. The Varsity coach was Tom Labella. The team lost 5 or 6 games that year. In his sophomore through senior seasons the team won 76 games in a row. That record has still not been broken.  The team won three State Championships and was ranked in the top 25 basketball teams in the country.  Corny was the captain in the 1976, 1977, 1978 seasons (sophomore-senior). Corny still holds many records at Middletown High School.

College  career
North Carolina, Wesleyan, Virginia, Princeton and UConn were the schools Corny narrowed his decision down to.  Corny liked the idea of staying close to home and he thought there would be advantages to being close to home. At Connecticut he was coached by Dom Perno. In his freshman season Corny started in every game, and the Huskies made the NCAA Tournament. Corny led the team in scoring all four years at UConn and finished with 1,810 points, and 1,017 rebounds.  Corny graduated in 1982 with a degree in Business

Professional career
Thompson was the 4th pick in the third round (50th overall) of the 1982 NBA draft by the Dallas Mavericks and played 44 games with them in the 1982–83 season, averaging 2.8 points, 2.7 rebounds and 0.8 assists per game. During the summer prior to his second year with the Mavericks, he suffered a knee injury, after which he was released from the team. Corny worked hard to get healthy and played basketball in Italy for Pallacanestro Varese in the Italian league for six years. It is when he played in the Spanish ACB League for a great Joventut Badalona team between 1990 and 1994 that he reached his full potential though, making it to the FIBA European League final in 1992 and winning the title in 1994.Tompson scoring the winning 3 point shot at the 1994 FIBA European League Final Four against Olympiacos.

References

External links
 NBA stats @ basketballreference.com
 Fibaeurope.com profile

1960 births
Living people
African-American basketball players
American expatriate basketball people in Italy
American expatriate basketball people in Spain
American men's basketball players
Baloncesto León players
Basketball coaches from Connecticut
Basketball players from Connecticut
Continental Basketball Association coaches
Dallas Mavericks draft picks
Dallas Mavericks players
Detroit Spirits players
Joventut Badalona players
Liga ACB players
McDonald's High School All-Americans
Pallacanestro Varese players
Parade High School All-Americans (boys' basketball)
Power forwards (basketball)
UConn Huskies men's basketball players
21st-century African-American people
20th-century African-American sportspeople